The 3rd constituency of Paris is a French legislative constituency in the Paris département (75). Like the other 576 French constituencies, it elects one MP using the two-round system. The constituency is located in the north of Paris.  Prior to the 2012 election, the constituency was on the South bank of the Seine.  The areas in the old 3rd constituency were split between the 2nd and 12th.

Historic representation

Election results

2022

 
 
 
 
 
 
 
 
|-
| colspan="8" bgcolor="#E9E9E9"|
|-

2017

 
 
 
 
 
 
|-
| colspan="8" bgcolor="#E9E9E9"|
|-

2012

 
 
 
 
 
 
|-
| colspan="8" bgcolor="#E9E9E9"|
|-

2007
Elections between 1988 and 2007 were based on the 1988 boundaries.

 
 
 
 
 
|-
| colspan="8" bgcolor="#E9E9E9"|
|-

2002

 
 
 
 
 
 
|-
| colspan="8" bgcolor="#E9E9E9"|
|-

1997

 
 
 
 
 
 
|-
| colspan="8" bgcolor="#E9E9E9"|
|-

References

Government of Paris
3